Telepac is the Portuguese internet service brand of the Portugal Telecom group.

Use
The Telepac brand dates from the time when Portugal Telecom didn't yet exist. It was used beginning in 1985 by Telefones de Lisboa e Porto (TLP) and Correios, Telefones e Telégrafos (CTT) for its Videotex services. It was the property of Transdata, a joint venture between CTT and TLP.

In 1992, a merger with CTT created Telecom Portugal, which didn't modify the videotex management. In 1995 they started to offer internet services.

In 1999, they became the ISP of SAPO.

References

External links

Telecommunications companies of Portugal
Products introduced in 1985
Products introduced in 1995
1985 establishments in Portugal